Gdynia Obłuże Leśne is a PKP freight railway station in Gdynia (Pomeranian Voivodeship), Poland.

Lines crossing the station

References 
Gdynia Obłuże Leśne article at Polish Stations Database, URL accessed at 17 June 2006

Obluze Lesne